"It Won't Be Like This for Long" is a song co-written and recorded by American country music artist Darius Rucker, lead vocalist of the rock band Hootie & the Blowfish. It was released in November 2008 as the second from his first country music album Learn to Live.  Rucker co-wrote the song with Chris DuBois and Ashley Gorley.

Content
The song is a mid-tempo mostly accompanied by acoustic guitar and piano. The song describes a couple who have just had a baby, and throughout it chronicles how their lives change by the child's presence. In the first verse, the child is crying at night, keeping both parents awake. The mother then tells the father that evenings will change when the child grows.

In the second verse, the daughter is four years old, and is being taken to preschool. She hangs on to her father's leg because she is afraid, and the teacher tells him "it won't be like this for long". By the third verse and bridge, the father is observing the daughter and realizing that the daughter will soon be grown up, and he will not be able to observe her much longer.

According to Country Weekly magazine, Rucker met with Chris DuBois and Ashley Gorley to write the song. The three songwriters were talking about their kids and "how quickly life changes." As the songwriters were talking, they decided to write the song.

Critical reception
The song received a "thumbs down" review from the country music site Engine 145. Brady Vercher stated that "the lyric itself is too straightforward to carry much emotional resonance despite Rucker's best efforts." He also considered it derivative of Trace Adkins' early 2008 hit "You're Gonna Miss This", which was also co-written by Ashley Gorley and contains a theme of a parent observing a daughter's growing up. Allen Jacobs of Roughstock gave the song a more favorable review, saying that "Rucker's butter-smooth vocals catch a country cadence, as his balladeers a promise of improvement in a loved one - and his own life."

Music video
A music video was released for the song in February 2009. As with his previous two music videos ("Don't Think I Don't Think About It" and "Winter Wonderland"), the video for "It Won't Be Like This for Long" was directed by Wayne Isham.

Chart performance
The song debuted at number 45 on the Hot Country Songs chart dated November 1, 2008 and peaked at number 1 on the chart dated March 28, 2009 and remained there for the next two weeks.

Year-end charts

Certifications

References

2008 singles
Darius Rucker songs
Music videos directed by Wayne Isham
Songs written by Darius Rucker
Songs written by Ashley Gorley
Song recordings produced by Frank Rogers (record producer)
Songs written by Chris DuBois
Capitol Records Nashville singles
2008 songs